Bows for Musical Instruments of the Violin Family is a seminal luthier reference book compiled by the late Chicago violinist Joseph Madison Roda (1894–1970) and published in 1959 by William Lewis and Son of Chicago.  The book is about bows and bow makers and includes detailed illustrations prepared by Gladys Mickel Bell (1901–1992).  Roda, a Czech immigrant from the small village Nový Dvůr near Myslív, had been a violinist with the Chicago Grand Opera Company from 1933 to 1935 and a violist with the Chicago Symphony from 1936 to 1956  Bell, at the time, was a violinist, cellist, music educator, and sales person at William Lewis and Son.

External links

References 

Encyclopedias of music
1959 non-fiction books
Lutherie reference books